Helmuts Balderis-Sildedzis (born 31 July 1952) is a former Soviet and Latvian ice hockey player. He played right wing, participated in the Soviet team's losing effort in the Miracle on Ice, and played part of a single season in the NHL after being drafted in 1989 by the Minnesota North Stars, becoming the oldest player to be drafted by an NHL team at the age of 36.

Playing career

Balderis played in the Soviet Hockey League for Dinamo Riga (1969–1977, 1980–1985) and CSKA Moscow (1977–80). He was the leading scorer in the 1977 and 1984 seasons, winning the Player of the Year award in 1977. He was the best player of Soviet-occupied Latvia in the 1970s and 1980s and the most prolific scorer from that country, tallying 333 goals in Soviet league play.

Balderis played for the Soviet national team, on the losing side of the Miracle on Ice game in 1980 but winning the World Championships in 1978, 1979 and 1983. Balderis represented the USSR in five IIHF World Championships (1976–1979, 1983), 1976 Canada Cup and 1980 Winter Olympics. He was named Best Forward in the 1977 World Championships. He was not selected for the USSR's 1984 Olympic team and played in only one major international tournament after he left CSKA Moscow to go back to play for Dinamo Riga in 1980.

In 1985, Balderis retired and became a coach in Japan. He returned in 1989, when Soviet players were allowed to play in the NHL. Balderis was drafted by the Minnesota North Stars, playing 26 games and scored 3 goals with 6 assists. He became the oldest ever player drafted by an NHL team (36) and the oldest player to score his first goal (37). He retired again after one season in Minnesota, but came out of retirement for the second time when Latvia regained its independence. Balderis played several games for the newly recreated Latvian national team (in 1992), serving as its captain and scoring 2 goals. He later coached the team and served as its general manager. He currently serves as board member of the Latvian Ice Hockey Federation.

In 1998, he was inducted into IIHF International Hockey Hall of Fame.

Awards
Soviet league First All-Star Team (1977)
Izvestia Trophy (Soviet League Top Scorer) (1977, 1983)
Soviet League Player of the Year (1977)
World Championships All-Star Team (1977)
Named Best Forward at the World Championships (1977)
Leading Scorer of the Latvian League (1993)

Career statistics

Regular season and playoffs

International

References

External links

Helmut Balderis at Team CCCP International
 Helmūts Balderis-Sildedzis at The Latvian Olympic Committee
 Helmuts Balderis at The Russian Ice Hockey Federation

1952 births
Living people
Dinamo Riga players
Dynamo sports society athletes
HC CSKA Moscow players
Ice hockey players at the 1980 Winter Olympics
IIHF Hall of Fame inductees
Latvian ice hockey right wingers
Minnesota North Stars draft picks
Minnesota North Stars players
Olympic ice hockey players of the Soviet Union
Olympic medalists in ice hockey
Olympic silver medalists for the Soviet Union
Soviet expatriate ice hockey players
Soviet expatriate sportspeople in the United States
Ice hockey people from Riga
Medalists at the 1980 Winter Olympics
Honoured Masters of Sport of the USSR
Recipients of the Order of Friendship of Peoples